Sankat Mochan Mahabali Hanumaan is an Indian-Television drama series that aired on Sony Entertainment Television (India) weekly. It depicts the story of Lord Hanuman told from the viewpoint of Lord Shri Krishna and Devi Rukmini.
The series ran from May 2015 to August 2017.

Plot
Follows the life of Lord Hanuman, a destroyer of obstacles, and traces his journey from his childhood till the time he met Lord Rama and became his devout disciple to become the hero of the Sanskrit epic the Ramayana.

Cast

 Nirbhay Wadhwa as Hanuman / Vrishkapi
 Gagan Malik as Vishnu / Rama / Krishna
Tushar Dalvi as Valmiki
 Deblina Chatterjee as Lakshmi / Sita / Rukmini / Vedavati / Vishwamohini / Kali
 Reem Sheikh as Vandevi
 Sheena Bajaj Purohit as Naagin
 Ankur Verma / Arun Mandola as Lakshmana
 Khyati Mangla as Urmila
 Nishant Kumar as Shatrughna
 Vikram Sharma as Sugriva / Bhim 
 Amit Mehra as Shiva
 Priyanka Singh as Parvati / Navadurga / Adi Parashakti / Tara / Sati / Lalita
 Anju Jadhav as Saraswati
 Aishwarya Sharma / Nidhi Jha  as Jambavati
 Sonal Parihar as Satyabhama
 Pooja Khatri as Kalindi
 Saina Kapoor as Mitravinda
 Aishwarya Raj Bhakuni as Kayadhu
 Bharat Chawda / Gagan Kang as Kesari / Vibhishan
 Barkha Sengupta as Anjana
 Samragyi Nema as Kaushalya
 Alefia Kapadia / Reshmi Ghosh as Kaikeyi
 Kanishka Soni as Sumitra
 Kunal Bakshi as Yuddhajit
 Yogesh Mahajan as Dasharath
 Gajendra Chauhan as Sumant
 Mukul Raj Singh as Angad
 Manoj Verma as Vishwamitra
 Tarakesh Chauhan as Prajapati Daksh / Durvasa

Recurring roles

 Saibal Sandhir as Dhanwantri Dev
 Lovekesh Solanki as Garuda Dev
 Vikas Grover as Devrishi Narad
 Vimarsh Roshan/ Sandeep Rajora as Surya Dev
 Manas Shah as Devraj Indra
 Preetika Chauhan as Shachi 
 Manish Bishla as Vayu Dev
 Pankaj Motla as Arun Dev
 Ravi Kumar as Varun Dev
 Kaushik Chakravorty as Devguru Brihaspati
 Triyug Mantri as Kaal Dev/Yamraj
 Devendra Mishra as Shani Dev
 Sangam Rai as Nagraj punchfan 
 Sunil Nagar as Brahmadev

Former cast

 Ishant Bhanushali as Hanuman (Younger)
 Arpit Gupta as Hanuman (Newborn)
 Ankur Verma as Lakshman
 Shrashti Maheshwari as Tara 
 Aarya Babbar/Saurav Gurjar as Vali/Ravan
 Ram Awana as Kaalnemi
 Vishal Jethwa as Vali (Younger)
 Bhadra Parekh as Sugriva (Younger)
 Ayaan Zubair Rahmani as Prahlad
 Ajay Kumar Nain as Hiranyakashipu
 KK Goswami as Atibala
 Meet Mukhi as Rama (Younger)
 Eklavya Ahir as Bharata (Younger)
 Krish Chauhan as Lakshman (Younger)
 Vansh Sayani as Shatrughna (Younger)
 Aditya Rathore as Jitantak/Ganesha
 Sumit Kaul as Rakshas Chakrasura
 Vinit Kakar as Mahaparshva
 Arpit Ranka as Shatanand Ravan
 Ketan Karande as Ahiravan
 Sharhaan Singh as Indrajeet/Meghnath
 Tasha Kapoor as Mandodari
 Paridhi Sharma as Kaikesi
 Riyanka Chanda as Draupadi
 Naina Gupta as Maharani Kishkindha
 Neha Chowdhury as Apsara
 Vishal Patni as Nikumbha
 Zubair Ali as Lavanasur
 Aishwarya Sharma as Jamwanthi

International broadcast 
Sankatmochan Mahabali Hanuman has been telecasted in the following languages:
Tamil as Jai Hanuman on Sun TV from 5 June 2016 to 7 March 2020
Malayalam has two dubbed versions 
Mahaveera Hanumaan on Surya TV from 4 April 2016 to 2018.
 Mahasakthiman Hanuman on Mazhavil Manorama from 10 December 2018 to 2019.
Telugu as Sri Anjaneyam on Gemini TV
 Kannada as Jai Bajarangi on Udaya TV from 21 September 2020 to 3 April 2021
 In Thailand, the drama airs on Channel 8 dubbed into Thai as หนุมาน สงครามมหาเทพ.
In Marathi as *Mahabali Hanuman* on Sony Marathi. 
In Bengali as *Mahabali Hanuman* on Sony AATH.
In Odia as *Sankata Mochana Mahabali Hanuman* on Tarang TV.

Notes

References

External links
 

Sony Entertainment Television original programming
2015 Indian television series debuts
2017 Indian television series endings
Television series based on the Ramayana